Karpenka is a village (selo) in the Krasnokutsky District of Saratov Oblast, Russia, located on the right bank of the Yeruslan River (Volga's tributary),  southeast of Saratov, the administrative center of the oblast. Population: 641.

References 

Cities and towns in Saratov Oblast
Novouzensky Uyezd